Kosovo is a village in the municipality of Makedonski Brod, North Macedonia.

Demographics
According to the 2021 census, the village had a total of 54 inhabitants.

In the 2002 census, it had a total of 67 inhabitants. Ethnic groups in the village include:

Macedonians 44
Albanians 3
 Оthers 1
Persons for whom data are taken from administrative sources 6

References

Villages in Makedonski Brod Municipality
Albanian communities in North Macedonia